This was the second tournament held in 1991 at the city of Guarujá. Olivier Delaître and Rodolphe Gilbert were the champions in February. None competed this month.

Jacco Eltingh and Paul Haarhuis won the title by defeating Bret Garnett and Todd Nelson 6–3, 7–5 in the final.

Seeds

Draw

References

External links
 Official results archive (ATP)
 Official results archive (ITF)

Bliss Cup
Guarujá Open